Uropeltis broughami, commonly known as Brougham's earth snake or the Sirumalai shieldtail, is a species of snake in the family Uropeltidae. The species is endemic to the Western Ghats in southern India.

Etymology
The specific name, broughami, is in honor of British botanist Henry Brougham Guppy.

Geographic range
U. broughami is found in the Sirumalai Hills and Palni Hills in Tamil Nadu, southern India.

Type locality of Silybura broughami = "Sirumallay hills (Madura district), 5500 feet elevation".Type locality of Silybura levingii = "Lower Pulney hills (Madura district), 4000 feet elevation".

Description
The dorsum of U. broughami is brown, with transverse series of small yellow black-edged ocelli. The sides have a series of large yellow spots. The ventrals are dark brown.

The dorsal scales are arranged in 19 rows at midbody. The ventrals number 203–230, and the subcaudals numbersubcaudals 7-10.

The snout is acutely pointed. The rostral is laterally compressed, obtusely keeled above, two fifths the length of the shielded part of the head, the portion visible from above much longer than its distance from the frontal. The nasals are in contact with each other behind the rostral. The frontal is as long as broad, or slightly longer than broad. The eye is very small, not half the length of the ocular. The diameter of the body goes 34 to 40 times into the total length. The ventrals are not twice as broad as the contiguous dorsal scales. The tail is obliquely truncate, flat above, with strongly pluricarinate scales. The terminal scute is bicuspid.

Reproduction
U. broughami is viviparous.

References

Further reading

Beddome RH (1878). "Description of six new Species of Snakes of the Genus Silybura, Family Uropeltidæ, from the Peninsula of India". Proceedings of the Zoological Society of London 1878: 800–802. (Silybura broughami, new species, p. 800; and Silybura levingii, new species, p. 801).
Beddome RH (1886). "An Account of the Earth-Snakes of the Peninsula of India and Ceylon". Annals and Magazine of Natural History, Fifth Series 17: 3-33.
Boulenger GA (1890). The Fauna of British India, Including Ceylon and Burma. Reptilia and Batrachia. London: Secretary of State for India in Council. (Taylor and Francis, printers). xviii + 541 pp. (Silybura broughami, p. 264).
Sharma RC (2003). Handbook: Indian Snakes. Kolkata: Zoological Sutvey of India. 292 pp. .
Smith MA (1943). The Fauna of British India, Ceylon and Burma, Including the Whole of the Indo-Chinese Sub-region. Reptilia and Amphibia. Vol. III.—Serpentes. London: Secretary of State for India. (Taylor and Francis, printers). xii + 583 pp. (Uropeltis broughami, new combination, p. 83).

Uropeltidae
Snakes of India
Endemic fauna of the Western Ghats
Reptiles described in 1878
Taxa named by Richard Henry Beddome